Table tennis rubber is a type of rubber used as covering on a racket in table tennis. Modern table tennis rubber is usually composed of two layers: a layer of foam ("sponge") underneath and a layer of actual rubber on the surface. There are four common types of table tennis rubbers: short pips, long pips, antispin, and inverted. The thickness and density of the sponge layer underneath also affects how the rubber will handle the ball.

Because of the large variety of table tennis rubbers, there are a larger variety of playing styles in table tennis than in other racket sports.

History 
Rubber was first used in table tennis with the rise of hard racket paddles in the 1930s; the rubber consisted of short pimples over a wooden blade. In the 1950s, the sponge racket was introduced. It had a layer of foam underneath the layer of rubber. The foam helps provide more spin and speed. The International Table Tennis Federation (ITTF) regulated the thickness of the foam + rubber layer to a maximum of 4 mm ( inch) thick, which has been the regulation in table tennis since.

Until 1986, players often had the same color of rubber on both sides of their paddle so that opponents could not tell which side of the paddle was being used. On July 1, 1986, two years before table tennis's introduction to the Olympics, the ITTF made it a rule that competition paddles had to have black rubber on one side and red rubber on the other side.

Types of rubber 
Table tennis rubber has four common types: inverted and short pips rubber are primarily offensive, while long pips and antispin are primarily defensive. The word "pip" refers to the usually conic-shaped raised bumps on top of the rubber in short and long pips rubber or the bumps on the inside attached to the foam on inverted or antispin rubber.

Inverted 
Inverted rubber is an offensive rubber and the most popular type of rubber. They are smooth on the outside, leaving the pips on the inside touching the foam, which is why it is called inverted. Inverted rubber's wide variety of speeds and spins make it a favorite among players. Manufacturers will provide speed and spin ratings to differentiate their type of inverted rubber from others. The faster the speed rating, the harder it is to control.

Tensioned rubber 
Before 2007, professional players often used speed glue on their inverted rubber to increase both speed and spin. After the ITTF banned speed glue due to health concerns, manufacturers have employed different methods to create inverted rubber with similar effects of speed glue. These new types of inverted rubber are called tensioned rubber, also called high tension, pre-tensed, or tensor rubber. They come in two types: mechanically tensioned rubber and chemically tensioned rubber. The two types differ mainly in the manufacturing process; mechanically tensioned rubber is made by gluing the rubber topsheet in a vacuum to cause the rubber to expand, and chemically tensioned rubber soaks the bottom foam layer in chemicals that cause the same effect as speed glue on the foam, but lasts longer.

Short pips 
Short pips rubber, also called pips out rubber, is a more controlled attack rubber that provides more speed but less spin to an attack than inverted rubber. Due to the small contact surface with the ball, short pips rubber is not easily affected by the opponent's spin; instead, it will knock a ball away. Therefore, the rubber is usually used for blocking, hitting, and counterattack strokes.

Long pips 
Long pips rubber is a defensive rubber. As its name suggests, the rubber has longer pips than short pips, and usually it also has thinner pips. The flexibility of the pips creates a low friction effect. As a result it provides little spin because the spinning ball slips on the rubber. When provided with a heavy topspin ball from an opponent's rubber, the opponent's spin is returned. However if the opponent sends backspin, the spin is again returned but will be topspin to the opponent which can cause confusion as inverted rubber or short pips rubber would return backspin for the same stroke. This is called "spin reversal" though in fact the spin does not reverse from the point of view of the bystander. The occasion when spin reverses is actually when both players are executing backspin or both executing topspin.

Antispin 
Antispin rubber is a defensive rubber with a smooth surface and very soft sponge. Due to the soft sponge, this rubber dampens speed of the ball and returns the ball at a low speed. It is usually used by defensive players on one side of their racket only. Unlike inverted rubber, it does not grip the ball, so opponents' balls are returned with little spin. However, against heavy spin, antispin rubber will return the ball with an opposite spin, similar to long pips.

Other rubbers

Medium pips 
Medium pips rubber is a mainly offensive rubber with pips out like the long and short pips rubber. It is more attack-oriented and has less spin than the long pips rubber, but is not as offensive as the short pips rubber.

Sponge thickness and density 

The thickness of the sponge and the density of the sponge layer underneath the rubber also affects the handling of the ball. These affect inverted and antispin rubbers the most, because they rely on sponge for spin and speed more than short and long pips rubber.

Thickness 
Sponge thickness affects the overall rubber speed and control. As a rule of thumb, the thinner the sponge, the more control you have, and the thicker the sponge, the faster it is. Rubbers labeled MX or MAX, short for maximum, have the maximum amount of sponge under the rubber without going over the ITTF regulation of 4.0 mm (0.16 inch). Rubbers labeled OX, short for orthodox, have no sponge beneath the rubber. Usually, inverted and antispin rubber have a larger foam thickness while pip rubber have a smaller thickness.

Density 
Sponge density, also called sponge hardness, affects the over rubber spin. As a rule of thumb, a lower density sponge, will have more spin at lower speeds, while a higher sponge density will have more spin at higher speeds. The sponge density affects antispin rubbers the most, for they rely on a soft sponge and a hard rubber surface to reverse spin.

References 

Table tennis